Rajmund Moric (born 27 June 1944 in Katowice) is a Polish politician. He was elected to the Sejm on 25 September 2005, getting 3091 votes in 29 Gliwice district as a candidate from the Samoobrona Rzeczpospolitej Polskiej list.

He was also a member of PRL Sejm 1985-1989.

See also
Members of Polish Sejm 2005-2007

External links
Rajmund Moric - parliamentary page - includes declarations of interest, voting record, and transcripts of speeches.

1944 births
Living people
Politicians from Katowice
Members of the Polish Sejm 2005–2007
Self-Defence of the Republic of Poland politicians